Hipparchia azorina, the Azores grayling, is a species of butterfly in the family Nymphalidae. It is endemic to the Azores. Its natural habitats are temperate forests and temperate grassland. It is threatened by habitat loss.

Description in Seitz
S. azorinus Streck. This insect, which is unknown to me in nature, is said to be from the Azores.Dark brown ; forewing with paler, yellowish, disc and a small apical ocellus ; hindwing with an ill-defined yellow middle band which is strongly incurved above the anal angle and beneath the apex. Fringes chequered. Underside of hindwing with a pure white, sharply defined median band, at the basal side of which there are two white spots, one irregular near the base, the second quadrangular- below the cell. Described form a male. This form, which Strecker placed near neomiris, appears to be allied to alcyone.

Sources 

 Van Swaay, C.A.M. & Warren, M.S. 2000. Hipparchia azorina. 2006 IUCN Red List of Threatened Species. Downloaded 31 July 2007.

Hipparchia (butterfly)
Endemic arthropods of the Azores
Butterflies described in 1899
Butterflies of Africa
Taxonomy articles created by Polbot